Tuţuleşti may refer to several places in Romania:

Ţuţuleşti, a village in Suseni Commune, Argeș County
Tuţuleşti, a village in Racoviţa Commune, Vâlcea County